The Network of Cancer Genes (NCG) is a freely accessible web resource of cancer genes and their associated properties. The project started in 2010 and in August 2018 has reached its 6th release: NCG6.0. NCG6.0 reports information on 2,372 protein-coding cancer genes, including 711 known cancer genes from the Cancer Gene Census and the Vogelstein, Science 2013 list. The remaining 1,661 cancer genes are candidate cancer genes annotated from the manual curation of 273 original publications. For each cancer gene NCG6.0 reports its system-level properties, the publications reporting it as a known or candidate cancer gene and information on the design of their cancer sequencing screens. In addition, the database provides annotations on 250 possible false positive genes, defined as candidate cancer genes whose association with cancer is likely to be spurious.

Cancer sequencing screens 
The 273 manually annotated publications in NCG6.0 describe a total 278 whole genome or whole exome cancer sequencing screens. These screenings included a total of 34,905 patients from 119 different cancer types. These include cancer sequencing screens of samples from 31 different anatomical sites, as well as 4 adult and 2 paediatric pan-cancer sequencing screens. NCG6.0 allows to perform advanced searches and retrieve information on cancer genes by: primary anatomical site, cancer type, and by sequencing screens or publication.

Systems level properties 

Systems-level properties are properties of genes independent on an individual's gene function. Some of these properties can be used to distinguish cancer genes from the rest of human genes. The systems-level properties reported by NCG are:

 Duplicability: i.e. the presence of additional genomic sequences matching at least 60% of the gene sequence.
 Evolutionary appearance: the presence or absence of ortholog genes in seven branches of the tree of life (Prokaryotes, Eukaryotes, Opisthokonts, Metazoans, Vertebrates, Mammals, Primates)
 Protein-protein interactions: a list of all human proteins interacting with the main protein encoded by the gene of interest and the number of complexes it is part of.
 microRNA-gene interactions: a list of experimentally verified interactions between the gene of interest and human miRNAs.
 Functional properties: a list of the functional classes of the gene of interest.
 Gene expression and protein expression: List of normal tissues and cancer cell lines the gene of interest is expressed in.
 Essentiality: a list of human cell lines in which the gene was found to be essential.

Previous versions 

 NCG5.0
 NCG4.0
 NCG3.0
 NCG2.0

References

External links 

 NCG6.0: http://ncg.kcl.ac.uk
 NCG5.0: http://ncg.kcl.ac.uk/ncg5/
 NCG4.0: http://ncg.kcl.ac.uk/ncg4/

Biological databases
Cancer genome databases
Cancer research